Invermere is a community in eastern British Columbia, Canada, near the border of Alberta. It is the hub of the Columbia Valley between Golden to the north and Cranbrook to the south. Invermere sits on the northwest shore of Windermere Lake and is a popular summer destination for visitors and second home owners from Edmonton and Calgary.

Geography

Invermere is situated within the Columbia River Wetlands, North America's largest intact wetland and a Ramsar-designated site.

Climate
Invermere's climate is characterized by warm summers and cool winters. The Rocky Mountains to the east shield Invermere from the Arctic air in winter, although extreme cold spells do occur on occasion. Spring arrives earlier than on the prairies to the east of the Rocky Mountains. Although warm, summers are variable, with weather alternating between hot, dry spells and cool, showery periods.

Demographics 

Religion 
According to the 2021 census, religious groups in Invermere included:
Irreligion (2,380 persons or 62.7%)
Christianity (1,340 persons or 35.3%)
Buddhism (20 persons or 0.5%)
Hinduism (20 persons or 0.5%)
Other (35 persons or 0.9%)

Arts and culture
The annual Invermere MusicFest takes place on the Pynelogs greenspace for one weekend every August.  The two-day Festival attracts hundreds of people each day and delivers a high caliber of Canadian and international musical talent, including The Dead South and Lindi Ortega in 2018.

Sports and recreation

Hockey
The Columbia Valley Rockies play in Invermere.  Former New York Islanders and University of Denver goaltender Wade Dubielewicz was born in Invermere.

Skiing
 Panorama Mountain Village lies about 30 minutes west.
 Fairmont Hot Springs Resort ski area lies 25 minutes south.
 Kimberley Alpine Resort is about 1 hour south in Kimberley.
 Kicking Horse Mountain Resort is about 1.5 hours north of Invermere in Golden, British Columbia

Skating
The longest ice skating trail in the world can be found on the Lake Windermere Whiteway. The naturally frozen trail measures .

Golfing
Invermere is a major centre for golf.
The Resort Course and Springs Course at Radium Resort, Radium Hot Springs are very popular.
Mountainside, Creekside, and Riverside golf courses are located in Fairmont Hot Springs, 20 minutes south of Invermere.
 Edgewater Hill Top Par 3 is located in Edgewater, 20 minutes north of Invermere.

Gliding and soaring

The Invermere Airport is home to the non-profit Canadian Rockies Soaring Club.  The club is active during the summer months, when it welcomes dozens of student pilots and private owners.  The Invermere Soaring Centre is a separate commercial operation which provides aerotowing services and glider rides to the general public.
Canadian Rockies Soaring Club
Invermere Soaring Centre
The local area is also a popular destination for other non-motorized forms of flying including hang-gliding and paragliding. There are designated launch sites at nearby Mount Swansea.

Curling
The Valley is host to the biggest outdoor bonspiel in Canada every January. The spiel is held on the frozen Windermere Lake. The curling club is also host to many leagues and bonspiels throughout the season.

Hot springs
Hot springs are numerous in the area, with the major developed ones being Fairmont and Radium Hot Springs; the latter is located inside Kootenay National Park.

Less developed 'wilderness' hot springs can be found in the southern Columbia Valley, in Whiteswan Lake Provincial Park. Ram Creek Warm Springs, a less visited and cooler natural spring, can also be accessed along the same route.

Media

Invermere is home to one newspaper, the Columbia Valley Pioneer. On July 1, 2017, the "Pioneer" (founded in 2004) and the Invermere Valley Echo (founded in 1956) merged to one paper retaining the Columbia Valley Pioneer designation. The "Pioneer" serves the Columbia Valley region, from Spillimacheen in the north to Canal Flats in the south and is published once a week, every Thursday.

Notable people
Wade Dubielewicz – Ice hockey player and coach
Christine Keshen – Curler
Patrick Morrow – Photographer
Benjamin Thomsen – Professional skier

References

External links

District municipalities in British Columbia
Columbia Valley
British Columbia populated places on the Columbia River
Populated places in the Regional District of East Kootenay